Saint Marciana of Toledo (died c. 303) is a venerated martyr in Toledo, Spain whose feast day is celebrated by both the Roman Catholic Church and the Eastern Orthodox Church on July 12.

Life
St. Marciana was born in Toledo, Spain, to a family of nobility. Nevertheless, she abhorred the worldly benefits of a high social status and she put aside her worldly riches. She decided to travel to Caesarea, Mauretania (modern-day Algeria) and lock herself in a cell within a cave  in order to preserve her virginity (for she was said to be very beautiful) and consecrate herself to God through various exercises in fasts and other practices of self-deprivation that were used in lieu of martyrdom.  Caesarea was by that time occupied by the Roman Empire under the Emperor Diocletian  (284-305 A.D.)  and hence, Roman influence was rampant around that city. One such influence was the introduction of the Roman gods and pagan worship to the statues of said gods. Marciana's confinement had given her a fervor for the revival of souls to God by means of a holy war on idolatry.  She was moved (some say by divine intervention)  to release herself from her confinement and walk among the proletariats within the city. While walking in the public square, Marciana noticed a statue to the Roman goddess Diana and in her religious zeal, she struck the statue's head off.  The defacement of a god's statue was considered a high offence according to Roman culture and Marciana was immediately arrested by a mob that insulted  and beat her with rods  and brought her before the imperial magistrate  to stand trial. Now this was during the time of Christian persecution by the Roman Empire, which involved the killing of Christians in amphitheaters by gladiators and/or wild animals. During her trial, Marciana fearlessly refused to recant either her faith or her actions against the statue of Diana and as result, she was handed over to gladiators to do with her as they wished.  However, none of the gladiators were able to touch her because they were overcome by a fear that inhibited any movement.  During this time (reportedly for three hours)  Marciana prayed for the gladiators’ salvation and one of them even converted to Christianity. When news of this foiled punishment reached the imperial magistrate, he was perplexed but intent on punishing Marciana. Thus, he condemned her to be killed in the amphitheater by a wild lion, who only went so far as to touch Marciana's chest and then retreated, as if restrained by an unforeseen force.   Witnessing this miraculous scene, many in the crowd were amazed and yelled for Marciana's release.  But it is said that a group of Jews who wished to see a Christian's death riled up the crowd and called for a wild bull to be brought into the arena.  A bull was set upon Marciana and it punctured her breast with its horns, releasing so much blood that Marciana was temporarily removed from the amphitheater to stop the bleeding. Nonetheless, the magistrate ordered Marciana to be returned to the arena. It is said that Marciana returned courageously to the arena and prayed,

“O Christ, I adore and love Thee. Thou wert with me in the prison and
kept me pure. Now Thou dost call me - O my Divine Master - and I go happily
to Thee. Receive my soul.”  

Following this prayer, a leopard was released into the amphitheater and mangled Marciana to death.  Through her death St. Marciana's received martyrdom.

Iconography

In this manuscript, St. Marciana is depicted at three points in time in the story of her martyrdom. At the top of the painting the magistrate condemns the haloed Marciana to be killed in the amphitheater while Marciana is restrained by three assistants as a lion approaches her feet. The bottom of the painting depicts Marciana breast being wounded by a bull and then a dying Marciana falls to the ground as a leopard bites her neck. 
This painting is very symbolic of the story surrounding St. Marciana. The artist decided clothe Marciana in a red dress that causes her to stand out from the other characters in the picture. The red dress pronounces her femininity and the red color symbolizes the Marciana's blood that is being spilt for her martyrdom. The halo painted around Marciana's head also establishes her sainthood and distinguishes her as a Christian (as opposed to the other people painted without halos in the manuscript). The artist also painted the three animals with distinct stances towards Marciana, as if they participate in a progression of increased violence towards Marciana. The lion appears to reverently approach Marciana's feet, as if in submission, symbolizing the lion's lack of physical violence towards Marciana. The bull, however was painted at Marciana's breast, not quite touching her, except for the bull's horns. The bull seems to reluctantly pierce Marciana and then stop short of any further mutilation. Both the lion and the bull seem to sense the divine power of God that surrounds Marciana. Finally, the leopard was painted just above Marciana, looming over her. In contrast to the other animals, the leopard is clearly in attack mode and is intent on not only wounding, but also taking Marciana's life. The leopard will not stop his attack until Marciana is dead. The scene represents the ultimate act of physical violence in the taking of a human life that is sacred, which is also the crucial element by which a Christian becomes a martyr. 

In this piece, the martyrdom of St. Marciana is drawn on the bottom left of the page, with a haloed Marciana lying on the ground of the arena, being attacked by a bull as onlookers watch. The date of her feast day is also inscribed on either side of the drawing. It is worthy of note that the primary attraction in this drawing is not St. Marciana, but the bull. Marciana certainly plays a major role in the subject of this drawing, but at first glance, one sees the bull before the saint. The bull is most visible, not only because of its large size, but also because of its stance. The artist, Jacques Callot, captures the bull in midair, with its horns lowered, giving the impression that the bull is both charging and pouncing on Marciana. The bull’s horns do not reach Marciana’s breasts in the drawing (like they do in the story), but are instead positioned to pierce Marciana “below her belt”. Literally and figuratively, this depiction is reminiscent of the bullfighting which was practiced (and continues to be practiced today) in Toledo and other parts of Spain. In bullfighting, even though the final act (i.e. the spearing of the bull) of the matador is masculine in style, the matadors wear traditional suits that are very flamboyant with a feminine flair.  In this way, the flashy colors of the outfits create a sort of sexual ambiguity of the matador and they are designed to tempt the male bull to charge at the matador. This, in turn, creates the image of the male bull attempting to charge, pierce, and violate femininity. The drawing of the bull attacking Marciana mirrors this concept within bullfighting and gives the impression that the bull not only intends to wound Marciana, but also to forcibly violate Marciana’s highly prized chastity through the raping of her virginity. It is as if the bull is about to perform the ultimate act of sexual violation against Marciana that the gladiators were unable to achieve. Marciana’s life is not the only thing at stake here. Her virginity and purity are in danger of being compromised, as well. This theme of hypermasculinity sexually taking advantage of vulnerable femininity is one that is very present in Spanish culture, art, and literature and would therefore be familiar to the people of Toledo.

Analysis
It is no great surprise that St. Marciana is the patron saint who is “invoked to cure wounds”, considering the way in which she became a martyr and a saint. According to some, since St. Marciana was wounded several times by different wild animals, she has endured this tribulation and is therefore able to be called upon to assist in the healing of others’ wounds and empathize with the wounded on earth. 
Although a patron saint of Toledo, there has been speculation that the Marciana of Toledo is actually the same woman as Marciana of Mauretania.  The stories of the two saints are strikingly similar, even aside from the name that they share. It has been suggested that the people of Toledo took the story of the martyrdom of St. Marciana of Mauretania, changed her birthplace to be in their city, and memorialized her feast day on July 12 (the day upon which Marciana’s “relics [her remains] were translated [removed]”  to Toledo) in their ancient prayer book, instead of on January 9 (the official feast day of St. Marciana of Mauretania). 
Regardless of the way in which the story of St. Marciana of Toledo came to be, Marciana’s story is not simply a story of martyrdom. It holds significance not only within its biblical imagery but also because it is a story of the ‘underdog’. The figure of Marciana is a representation of three major biblical persons: Jesus Christ, the Virgin Mary and Daniel. Like Daniel, Marciana is faced with the prospect of death by way of hungry lions. Both enter a sort of arena in which they are stalked as prey in an unfair fight. However, God’s hand works in the same way in both people’s situations: he shuts the lions’ mouths.  Marciana is also representative of the Virgin Mary because of her humility, obedience to God, and dedication to prayer, as well as her virginity and purity. Marciana goes to great lengths to guard her virginity through self-imprisonment in a cave. Yet, it is in obedience to God that Mary’s and Marciana’s virginities are put at stake for a higher purpose. For Mary, this higher purpose is to carry and give birth the Jesus and for Marciana it is to the pray for the conversion of a gladiator. Finally, Marciana exemplifies Jesus in the sacrifice of her life due to her faith and love in Christ. Similarly (albeit more significant), Jesus gives himself up to be killed on a cross because of his love and salvation for humanity. This element is even reflected in the prayer of St. Marciana:

“God, may the crown of martyrdom of your
child St. Marciana help us defend
your holy name so we too can love
you like St. Marciana did so
we too can die loving you
like Christ loved us.” 

Marciana sacrifices a temporary life on earth and the comforts of this world for a greater reward in heaven; that of eternal life. It is no wonder, considering the parallels between these three biblical characters and Marciana, that Marciana was commemorated by Christians belonging to both camps of Christendom: Roman Catholic and Orthodox Christian churches. 
Furthermore, Marciana's story is of the unlikely victor, in which the weak conquer the strong. Marciana's story is so intriguing because she fearlessly faced and often defeated (in her own way) forces that were much stronger than you. As a woman, especially as a virgin woman, Marciana would have been considered very vulnerable of being taken advantage of. In Roman society, women had few freedoms to speak of (they typically had little say in public life and even their private lives) and most often they were under the control of their husbands or nearest male relatives. For a woman like Marciana to make such a public statement by defacing the statue of Diana was a revolutionary concept for women. Marciana challenged the public view of religion and dared to declare Roman mythology as pagan and Christianity as the one, true faith. Marciana's peaceful defense of her virginity against the gladiators is also an example of fragility conquering what it brutish. Even in death, Marciana does not remain dead but her spirit is taken up to heaven where she receives an everlasting life with Christ and in Christ that will never end. St. Marciana's story sends the message that faith and belief in Jesus Christ is stronger than any worldly threat or force that one can encounter and this is a hope in which even the weakest (especially the weakest) and most vulnerable can take refuge.

See also
Torero

References

Bibliography

Cousin, Jean. "Diocletian." Encyclopædia Britannica. Encyclopædia Britannica, Inc., 28 Apr. 2015. Web. 27 June 2017. Diocletian | Biography, Empire, Definition, Persecution, & Reign.

George, Jomon. "Saint Marciana." Cherupushpam of Jesu. N.p., 01 Jan. 1970. Web. 25 June 2017. CHERUPUSHPAM OF JESUS: SAINT MARCIANA.

Phillips, Andrew. "Orthodox Europe: Latin Saints of the Orthodox Patriarchate of Rome." Latin Saints of the Orthodox Patriarchate of Rome. St. John's Orthodox Church, Colchester, n.d. Web. 20 June 2017. Latin Saints of the Orthodox Patriarchate of Rome.

Oliveira, Plinio Correa De. "St. Marciana - January 7." St. Marciana Virgin Martyr, Saint of January 7. Tradition in Action, Inc., n.d. Web. 21 June 2017. St. Marciana Virgin martyr, Saint of January 7.

"St.Abundias, Preacher and Martyr,July 11; St. Galbertus, Abbot of Vallombrosa, July 12; St. Marciana, Virgin and Martyr, July 12; St. Anacletus, Pope and Martyr, July 13; Fifty-eighth Plate from the Book, Les Images de Tous/Les Saincts et Saintes / De L'An – Jacques Callot, Israel Henriet." FAMSF Explore the Art. Fine Arts Museum of San Francisco, 8 May 2015. Web. 27 June 2017. .

"St. Marciana of Spain." Antiochian Orthodox Christian Archdiocese. Antiochan Archdiocese, n.d. 
Web. 24 June 2017. St. Marciana of Spain | Antiochian Orthodox Christian Archdiocese.

Spanish saints